Eye of the Hurricane is the third studio album from The Alarm. It was first released in October 1987 in the US on I.R.S. Records. The album was initially released on vinyl LP and cassette, reaching number 23 in the UK charts and number 77 in the US charts. A CD version was released later the same year and in 2000 an extended re-mastered version was released, including extra tracks.

Track listing
All songs written by  Eddie MacDonald & Mike Peters, except where noted.

Folklore 
"Rain in the Summertime" (The Alarm) - 5:12 
"Newtown Jericho" - 4:05 
"Hallowed Ground" - 4:17 
"One Step Closer to Home" (Dave Sharp, Nigel Twist) - 4:31 
"Shelter" (The Alarm) - 3:08
Electric 
"Rescue Me" - 3:19 
"Permanence in Change" - 4:01 
"Presence of Love" - 4:01 
"Only Love Can Set Me Free" - 4:22 
"Eye of the Hurricane" - 3:38

Personnel

Band members
Mike Peters - Lead vocals, acoustic and electric guitars, harmonica
David Sharp - Lead guitar, acoustic guitar, vocals on "One Step Closer to Home"
Eddie MacDonald - Bass, bass synthesizer, keyboards, programming, backing vocals
Nigel Twist - Drums, Linn Drum programming, backing vocals

Additional musicians
Chris Stainton: Piano and Hammond organ (tracks A4, B4, and B5)
Mark Taylor: Piano and DX7 Synthesizer (all other tracks, except A5)
John Porter: Programming

Single releases
"Rain in the Summertime" was released before the album, reaching number 18 in the UK singles chart. 
The album surfaced prior to the release of the second single, "Rescue Me," which reached number 48 and saw the band on The Roxy. "Rescue Me" also gained some exposure in the US, thanks to its appearance on the original soundtrack from the then-brand new TV series 21 Jump Street.
"Presence of Love" was the third and final single, peaking just shy of the Top 40.

Credits
Recorded & mixed at Great Linford Manor.

Engineer Tony Platt  
Mixed By David Leonard 
Producer The Alarm and John Porter

Remastered release
Released in 2000, the remastered edition featured a revised track listings, b-sides and previously unreleased recordings, new and original artwork, unseen photos, lyrics, sleeve notes by Mike Peters and interactive programming information to play the album in its original form.

Track listing 
"Electric"
"Newtown Jericho"
"Rain in the Summertime"
"Rose Beyond the Wall"
"Hallowed Ground"
"One Step Closer to Home"
"Shelter"
"Folklore"
"Eye of the Hurricane"
"Permanence in Change"
"Presence of Love"
"World on Fire"
"A Time to Believe"
"Only Love Can Set Me Free"
"Rescue Me"
"A New South Wales"
"Elders and Folklore"
"My Land Your Land"
"Pastures of Plenty"
"Rescue Me (Tearing The Bonds Assunder Mix)"
"Rain in the Summertime (Thunder/Through The Haze Mix)"

References

External links
The Alarm- Eye of the Hurricane @Discogs.com Retrieved 12-22-2013.

1987 albums
The Alarm albums
I.R.S. Records albums
Albums produced by John Porter (musician)